Hualien County (Mandarin Wade–Giles: Hua¹-lien² Hsien⁴; Pīnyīn: Huālián Xiàn; Hokkien POJ: Hoa-lian-koān or Hoa-liân-koān; Hakka PFS: Fâ-lièn-yen; Amis: Kalingko) is a county on the east coast of Taiwan. It is Taiwan's largest county by area, yet due to its mountainous terrain, has one of the lowest populations in the country. The county seat and largest city is Hualien City.

Most of the population resides in the Huadong Valley, which runs north to south, sandwiched between the Central and Hai'an mountain ranges. Due to the rural nature of the county, Hualien attracts many visitors for its natural environment, which includes Taroko Gorge, Qingshui Cliff and Qixingtan Beach.

Hualien is Taiwan's most renowned and popular travel destination. It's known as "No.2 Most Welcoming City on Earth" released by Booking.com in 2023, which is the only Asian city on the list.

History

Early history
Modern-day Hualien City was originally called Kilai, after the Sakiraya Taiwanese aborigines and their settlement.

Spanish settlers arrived in 1622 to pan for gold. Picking up the sounds of native words, these settlers called the area Turumoan. Han Chinese settlers arrived in 1851. Qing Dynasty records give the name of the region as Huilan due to the whirling of waters in the delta.

Empire of Japan

The official name became . Karenkō Prefecture consisted of modern-day Hualien County. Toward the end of World War II the Governor-General of Taiwan moved many Japanese residents of Taiwan to the area to develop agriculture.

Republic of China
After the handover of Taiwan from Japan to the Republic of China in October 1945, Hualien was established as a county named Hualien County of Taiwan Province on 9 January 1946. In 1951 Hualien was the first county in Taiwan to be governed according to the ROC local autonomy law. Today the Hualien area serves as the key population centre on the east coast as well as the one of five main life circle regions in Taiwan, together with Taipei, Taichung, Tainan and Kaohsiung.

2021 train derailment 
On 2 April 2021, a Taroko Express derailed at the north entrance of Qingshui Tunnel after striking an unattended flatbed truck that had fallen onto the tracks. The accident is the deadliest train accident in Taiwan since 1948, with at least 50 passengers reported dead and more than 150 injured.

Geography

Hualien County is situated in eastern Taiwan Island. It faces the Pacific Ocean towards Japan (Okinawa Prefecture) to the east, Central Mountain Range to the west bordering Taichung City, Nantou County and Kaohsiung City, Yilan County to the north and Taitung County to the south.

Despite its vast area, only 7% of the county area is populated. The remaining area is occupied by rivers (7%) and mountains (87%). Mountains are composed of Central Mountain Range in the west and Hai'an Range in the east. The main rivers in the county are the Hualian River, Xiuguluan River and their branches. Due to the restriction of its landscape, Hualien people reside mostly on the alluvial fans of the Huatung Valley plains.

Government

Administrative divisions
Hualien County is divided into 1 city, 2 urban townships, 7 rural townships and 3 mountain indigenous townships. Some towns have Japanese names because these towns were named by Japanese during the Japanese ruling period from 1895 to 1945. Hualien City is the county seat and houses the Hualien County Government and Hualien County Council.

Colors indicate the common language status of Hakka and Formosan languages within each division.

Politics

Hualien County voted one Democratic Progressive Party legislator to be in the Legislative Yuan during the 2016 Republic of China legislative election. The incumbent Magistrate of the county is Hsu Chen-wei of the Kuomintang.

Climate

Demographics and culture

Population
Hualien County has 318,995 inhabitants as of January 2023 and is divided into 1 city and 12 townships. Its late development means that many aboriginal cultures such as Amis, Atayal, Bunun, Truku, Sakizaya and Kavalan are well-preserved. As of 2014, aborigines make up 27.5% of the population of Hualien County (about 91,675). The Hakka people comprise about 30% of inhabitants.

The county has seen negative population growth since the early 2000s due to emigration to other places outside Hualien County, with an average reduction of 1,393 people per year over the past 18 years.

According to a 2015 survey on national happiness index, Hualien County was rated as the happiest place to live in Taiwan among other 20 counties and cities due to the residents happiness driven by strong levels of satisfaction with work-life balance, living condition, education, environmental quality and the performance of the local government.

Belief
The internationally famous Buddhist Tzu Chi foundation is headquartered in Hualien City. There are also many temples around the county. Buddhism and Folk religions are popular in Hualien County. Hualien County also has the highest concentration of Roman Catholics in Taiwan at 9.46% of the population.

Sports
Hualien County is home to the Hualien Stadium and Hualien Baseball Stadium.

Because of its awesome scenic view,  fresh air, fine weather, and plenty of well-maintained bike trails, Hualien County is a popular destination for cyclist enthusiasts and marathon runners. Many cycling tournaments and marathon events are held each year in Hualien County. For example, Taiwan KOM Challenge and Taroko Gorge Marathon.

Hualien also hosted the 2009 Asian Canoe Polo Championships.

Economy

There is cement mining activity in the county. The Asia Cement Corporation plant in Xincheng Township contributes nearly 29% of Taiwan's annual cement production.

Education 
The Hualien County Department of Education lists in all 6 institutions of higher learning within the county's borders as well as 15 high schools, 35 junior high schools and 151 elementary schools, though some of the listed elementary campuses have been closed for years due to their remote location or to low enrollments.

Primary and secondary education

Higher education 

Hualien County is home to National Dong Hwa University, Tzu Chi University, Taiwan Hospitality and Tourism University, Tzu Chi University of Science and Technology and Dahan Institute of Technology.

National Dong Hwa University is the first university and the most top ranked university in Hualien, holding highest numbers of students, the largest concert hall, the largest library in Hualien. National Hualien University of Education was the first normal school in Hualien and nine schools of its kind in Taiwan, which was merged with National Dong Hwa University in 2008.

Mandarin education 
National Dong Hwa University Chinese Language Center
Tzu Chi University Chinese Language Center

Energy

Hualien County houses the hydroelectric Bihai Power Plant with an installed capacity of 61.2 MW and coal-fired Hoping Power Plant with a capacity of 1,320 MW, the fourth largest coal-fired power plant in Taiwan. Both power plants are located in Xiulin Township.

Due to the power plant, Hoping is also the location of a deep water bulk cargo port. Hoping port is located in Hoping Village, Xiulin Township.

Tourist attractions

Nature
National parks in the county are Matai'an Wetland Ecological Park, Taroko National Park and Yushan National Park. The county is also home to several mountains and cliffs, such as Hehuan Mountain, Pingfeng Mountain, Qilai Mountain and Qingshui Cliff. Other natural areas include the Liyu Lake, Shihtiping, Mugua River Gorge, Walami Trail,  Niushan Huting, East Rift Valley, Rareseed Ranch, Lintianshan Forestry Culture Park and Qixingtan Beach.

Museums
Museums and historical buildings in Hualien County include Dongli Story House, Hualien Sugar Factory, Pine Garden, Saoba Stone Pillars, Hualien Cultural and Creative Industries Park, Lintian Police Substation and Old Lintian Police Station, Chihsing Tan Katsuo Museum and Hualien County Stone Sculptural Museum.

Theme parks
Farglory Ocean Park is in Hualien County.

Places of worships
Hualien Martyrs' Shrine, Hualien Sheng'an Temple, Hualien Chenghuang Temple, Xiangde Temple, Eternal Spring Shrine and Hualien Al-Falah Mosque are located in the county.

Markets
Night markets in the county are Dongdamen Night Market.

Transportation

Hualien Airport
Taiwan Railways Administration – North-Link Line and Hualien-Taitung Line
Provincial Highway No.8  (Central Cross-Island Highway)
Provincial Highway No. 9  (Su'ao-Hualien and Hualien-Taitung Highway)
Provincial Highway No. 11 (Hualien-Taitung Coast Highway)
Provincial Highway No. 14
Provincial Highway No. 16
Provincial Highway No. 23 (Fuli-Donghe Highway)
Provincial Highway No. 30 (Yuchang Highway)
County Road No.193
Port of Hualien
Heping Cement Port

Relative location

See also
List of tourist attractions in Taiwan

References